Amerer Air was a cargo airline based in Linz, Austria. It was Austria's largest dedicated cargo airline, operating services from Linz and Cologne throughout Europe, the Middle East and North Africa. Its main base was Linz Airport.

History 
The airline was established and started operations in 1995 with one Fokker F27 Mk500. Between 1997 and 2006 two Lockheed L-188 Electras were operated for United Parcel Service and TNT N.V. In 1999, international long distance road transport was introduced to supplement air freight activities. The airline was owned by Heinz Peter Amerer (50%) and Susanne Amerer (50%) and had 40 employees.

Fleet 

The airline operated:

2 Fokker F27 Mk500
2 Lockheed L-188 Electra

References 

Defunct airlines of Austria
Airlines established in 1995
Airlines disestablished in 2011
Defunct cargo airlines
2011 disestablishments in Austria
Austrian companies established in 1995